Honda (Spanish for "Depth") is an unincorporated community in Santa Barbara County, California, United States.

References

Unincorporated communities in California
Unincorporated communities in Santa Barbara County, California